Brechin in Forfarshire was a burgh constituency that elected one commissioner to the Parliament of Scotland and to the Convention of Estates.

After the Acts of Union 1707, Brechin, Aberdeen, Arbroath, Inverbervie and Montrose formed the Aberdeen district of burghs, returning one member between them to the House of Commons of Great Britain.

List of burgh commissioners

 1661: George Steill, bailie 
 1665 convention: David Donaldson the elder, bailie 
 1667 convention: John Kinloch, merchant, bailie 
 1669–74: James Strachan 
 1678 convention, 1681–82: David Donaldson the younger, dean of guild 
 1685–86: Francis Mollyson, bailie 
 1689 convention, 1689–93: Henry Maule of Kellie (declared absent, 1693) 
 1693–1701, 1702–07: Francis Mollyson, dean of guild

References

See also
 List of constituencies in the Parliament of Scotland at the time of the Union

Constituencies of the Parliament of Scotland (to 1707)
Politics of the county of Forfar
History of Angus, Scotland
Constituencies disestablished in 1707
1707 disestablishments in Scotland